Cristián Eduardo Canío Manosalva (born 31 May 1981) is a Chilean footballer that currently plays for Chilean Segunda División club Deportes Valdivia as a striker.

Honours

Club
Everton
 Primera División de Chile (1): 2008 Apertura
 Deportes Temuco
 Primera B de Chile (1): 2015–16

External links
 
  
 
  

1981 births
Chilean people of Mapuche descent
Mapuche sportspeople
Indigenous sportspeople of the Americas
Living people
People from Nueva Imperial
Chilean footballers
Deportes Temuco footballers
Universidad de Chile footballers
O'Higgins F.C. footballers
Ñublense footballers
Atlante F.C. footballers
Cobreloa footballers
Everton de Viña del Mar footballers
San Martín de Tucumán footballers
Audax Italiano footballers
Colo-Colo footballers
C.D. Antofagasta footballers
Coquimbo Unido footballers
Deportes Valdivia footballers
Chilean Primera División players
Liga MX players
Argentine Primera División players
Primera B de Chile players
Segunda División Profesional de Chile players
Chilean expatriate sportspeople in Mexico
Expatriate footballers in Mexico
Chilean expatriates in Mexico
Chilean expatriate sportspeople in Argentina
Expatriate footballers in Argentina
Chilean expatriates in Argentina
Chilean expatriate footballers
Association football forwards